David Aaron Williams (born March 12, 1979) is an American former professional baseball pitcher. He played in Major League Baseball (MLB) for the Pittsburgh Pirates, Cincinnati Reds, and New York Mets, and in Nippon Professional Baseball (NPB) for the Yokohama BayStars.

Career
Williams graduated in 1997 from Caesar Rodney High School in Camden, Delaware, and was drafted by the Pittsburgh Pirates the following year. He made his major league debut on June 6, .

2001
Williams pitched in 22 games, 18 starts for the Pirates, going 3-7 despite having an earned run average of 3.71 in 114 innings.

2002
In 2002, Williams endured a hard season, only pitching for the Pirates in 9 starts.

2003
Williams wasn't called up to the majors, he spent half the season in AAA before going down for the season due to injury.

2004
Williams made his return to Pittsburgh, pitching in 10 games while also starting 6 games.

2005
Williams pitched the whole season in Pittsburgh, going 10-11 while also throwing a complete game shutout. Williams averaged less than 6 innings, pitching only 138.2 innings in 25 starts.

2006
Williams was traded from the Pirates to the Cincinnati Reds for Sean Casey. On May 20, the Cincinnati Reds designated Williams for assignment after he went 2-3 with a 7.20 earned run average in eight starts. On May 25, he was traded to the New York Mets for pitcher Robert Manuel.

On August 18, the Mets recalled Williams from the Norfolk Tides to make a start in place of Pedro Martínez. Williams held the St. Louis Cardinals to two runs on seven hits and a walk while striking out four over 6.1 innings to pick up the victory in the Mets' 6-2 win. He finished the season with a 3-1 record and 5.59 earned run average in six appearances—five starts—and 29 innings with the Mets.

2007
The Mets signed Williams to a one-year contract, worth $1.25 million, for the  season, with incentives could have brought as much as $2 million.

In February, Williams had surgery to repair a herniated disc in his neck. He came off the disabled list on July 6, and made his only start of the year against the Houston Astros on July 8, giving up 8 runs in only 3.1 innings. He was then designated for assignment on July 14 so Oliver Pérez could return to the Mets rotation from the disabled list. He was called up again on September 1 when the roster expanded.

2008
Williams signed to pitch for the Yokohama BayStars of Nippon Professional Baseball for the  season on December 12, 2007. He was released on September 3, 2008.

2009
In February , Williams signed a minor league contract with the Washington Nationals with an option for the major leagues. He appeared in 21 games as a relief pitcher for Washington's Double-A affiliate, the Harrisburg Senators with a record of 1-3 and an earned run average of 3.56, and 19 games for their Triple-A affiliate, the Syracuse Chiefs, with a record of 0-1 and an earned run average of 7.89.

He filed for free agency in November 2009. He did not play professionally in 2010. After retiring he played for a semiprofessional team in Long Island. After that he coached with the Toronto Blue Jays.

References

External links

Major League Baseball pitchers
Cincinnati Reds players
Pittsburgh Pirates players
New York Mets players
Yokohama BayStars players
Erie SeaWolves players
Hickory Crawdads players
Williamsport Crosscutters players
Lynchburg Hillcats players
Altoona Curve players
Norfolk Tides players
St. Lucie Mets players
New Orleans Zephyrs players
Nashville Sounds players
Syracuse Chiefs players
American expatriate baseball players in Japan
Baseball players from Alaska
Sportspeople from Anchorage, Alaska
People from Camden, Delaware
1979 births
Living people
Long Island Ducks players
People from Douglasville, Georgia
Sportspeople from the Atlanta metropolitan area